Pieter Erasmus (born 19 March 1983) is a New Zealand former cricketer who was born in South Africa. He played four first-class matches for Auckland between 2006 and 2010.

See also
 List of Auckland representative cricketers

References

External links
 

1983 births
Living people
New Zealand cricketers
Auckland cricketers
People from Ceres, Western Cape
Cricketers from the Western Cape